Thomas Jubilee Burnett Lamprell (8 June 1887 – 25 August 1937) was an Australian rules footballer who played with St Kilda in the Victorian Football League (VFL).

Family
The son of Charles Lamprell (–1898), and Jane Lamprell (−1906), née Searle, Thomas Jubilee Burnett Lamprell was born at Mount Prospect, in Victoria, on 8 June 1887.

Marriages
He married Blanche Lamprell on 28 December 1909; they were divorced in 1922.

He married Ettie May Clark (−1929) in 1923.

He married Laura Isobel McLeod in 1934.

Football

St Kilda (VFL)
Granted a clearance from North Lyell Football Club in Tasmania to St Kilda on 18 May 1910, he played his single match for St Kilda, against Collingwood, on 21 May 1910.

Footscray (VFA)
He played 11 matches for Footscray in two seasons (1910, 1911).

Williamstown (VFA)
He played for Williamstown after crossing from Footscray during 1911 and in the first four matches of the 1912 season. He played a total of 11 games and kicked 6 goals for 'Town.

On 25 May 1912, "Observer", the football correspondent of The Williamstown Chronicle, reported that, "Lamprell has displeased the committee and will consequently 'stand down' for a while".

Death
He died at St Vincent's Hospital in Fitzroy on 25 August 1937.

Notes

External links 
 
 
 Thomas Lamprell, at The VFA Project.

1887 births
1937 deaths
Australian rules footballers from Tasmania
Australian Rules footballers: place kick exponents
St Kilda Football Club players